Gauci is a surname in use mainly in the Republic of Malta belonging to one of the most ancient and noble families on the island. It originates from the word Għawdxi (meaning Gozitan), in reference to a man from Gozo.

According to the Dictionary of American Family Names, it originated in Italy, flourished in Malta and from Malta spread to the UK, US, Canada and Australia with the Maltese diaspora; this would be due to the immigration (and also exile) of large numbers of people from Italy to Malta, although the name still appears in Italy. 

However, according to Professor Joseph Aquilina, Malta's foremost specialist in Maltese etymology and author of the encyclopaedic Maltese–English Dictionary, the surname is a Maltese original formation, originating in the medieval notarial transcription of the word "Għawdxi", meaning Gozitan or from the island of Gozo.  As such, "Għawdxi" is a nickname frequently given to Gozitans living or working in Malta. This origin would classify Italian holders of the surname as descendants of Maltese immigrants, rather than vice versa.

Bearers of the surname Gauci belong to one of the most ancient and noble families of Malta. The family hold the title of Marquis of Ghajn Qajjed, first granted to Dr. Gerolamo Delicata by Grant Master Emanuel de Rohan-Polduc. In 1796, the "Feudal Tribute" is "a bouquet of flowers on the feast of St. Martin, Pope (13 November) every year". The title in 1981 was held by Rev. Fr. Dictor Formosa-Gauci S.J.,, who is also "Count of Santa Sofia". Other notable bearers of this name include Charles A. Gauci, fellow of the Malta Heraldic Society and archivist to the Imperial Paleologue family.

In 1548, Francesco Gauci built Gauci Tower to protect his family.

Notable people 
Darren Gauci (born 1965), Australian jockey
Kylie Gauci, Australian wheelchair basketball player
Marika Gauci,(born 1971), Anglo-greek-Welsh, singer, chef and author
Maxim Gauci (1774–1854), English lithographer
Miriam Gauci (born 1957), Maltese opera singer
Natalie Gauci (born 1981), singer in Australia of mixed Maltese and Italian descent
Paul Gauci (fl. 1830s–1860s), Maltese-English lithographer
Redento Maria Gauci (1920–1978), Maltese Carmelite bishop 
Reuben Gauci (born 1983), Maltese footballer
Dennis Mark Gauci (born 1984), Maltese Entrepreneur
Tony Gauci (1944-2016), Maltese shopkeeper and witness for the prosecution in the Lockerbie case

References

Maltese-language surnames
Toponymic surnames